The BOK Center, or Bank of Oklahoma Center, is a 19,199-seat multi-purpose arena and a primary indoor sports and event venue in Tulsa, Oklahoma, United States. Designed to accommodate arena football, hockey, basketball, concerts, and similar events, the facility was built at a cost of $178 million in public funds and $18 million in privately funded upgrades. Ground was broken on August 31, 2005, and a ribbon-cutting ceremony took place on August 30, 2008.

Designed by César Pelli, the architect of the Petronas Towers in Malaysia, the BOK Center is the flagship project of Tulsa County's Vision 2025 long-range development initiative. Local firm, Matrix Architects Engineers Planners, Inc, is the architect and engineer of record.  The arena is managed and operated by SMG and named for the Bank of Oklahoma, which purchased naming rights for $11 million. The two current permanent tenants are the Tulsa Oilers of the ECHL and the Tulsa Oilers of the Indoor Football League, both teams owned by Andy Scurto. The BOK Center was the former home of the Tulsa Shock of the Women's National Basketball Association and the Tulsa Talons of the Arena Football League.

Design

Tulsa city officials asked César Pelli to create an arena that would be an architectural icon. To achieve this, Pelli employed cultural and architectural themes of the city, including Native American, art deco, and contemporary styles. He made heavy use of swirling circular elements in the exterior and interior designs of the building. The interior follows the motion, with grand staircases that wrap around a portion of the building from the main lobby. In total, the building's design required  of exterior stainless steel panels,  of glass,  of concrete, and 4,000 tons of structural steel.

Inside, the bowl area's ceiling rises  over the base floor and a -long HD ribbon screen wraps around the three-level seating area. Actual capacity fluctuates with configuration patterns, and total seating can vary from 13,644 to 19,199—13,644 for partial-use concerts, 16,582 for arena football, 17,096 for hockey, 17,839 for basketball, and 19,199 for center stage concerts. The bowl area's second floor, an exclusive carpeted level with a complete bar, houses press areas and 37 luxury suites, each with 15  seats and furnished gathering and kitchen areas. Private funding exceeded original forecasts, and unexpected increases in revenue from corporate sponsorships, donations, and purchases of box seats and luxury boxes paid for an advanced light display for the glass wall that wraps around the front of the building and the scoreboard.

Amenities
The BOK Center holds 37 public restrooms—12 men's restrooms, 16 women's restrooms, and 9 family restrooms—with 300 toilets and urinals. Dressing rooms with wooden lockers, hydrotherapy and workout rooms, a players lounge, locker rooms for game officials, and office space for coaches, trainers, and equipment managers are also located within the building. Designed by Forty Forty Agency and manufactured by Daktronics, the project received $3.6 million in private donations, with some funds going toward an advanced video recording system.

There are 14 concession outlets, seven of which belong to Tulsa-area restaurants that supplement typical arena food. Restaurant branches within the building are Billy's On the Square (American fast-casual), Mazzio's, Papa John's, Doc Popcorn, and The Dog House (hot dogs). General concessions serve Mexican food at Wholly Tacomoli, stuffed pretzels and hot dogs at Backstage, gourmet hot dogs at Frank's, chicken baskets and baked potatoes at Fuel and chicken sandwiches and veggie burgers at Roadie's Grill.

Nearly $1.5 million was allocated to artwork within the building in light of a city ordinance mandating that at least 1% of construction costs for any municipal project be used for public art. Tulsa's Arts Commission selected five artists out of nearly 300 applicants to decorate the interior of the building with the intention of capturing the spirit of the city and state. Of their pieces, the largest is a cloud-like cloth sculpture designed by Kendell Buster that weighs  and hangs above the main concourse. Four  Native American medallions designed by Bill and Demos Glass decorate the main concourse floor, along with a series of 25 paintings of tallgrass prairie landscapes created by Mark Lewis that adorn a wall on the main lobby's third level. A  black-and-white painting of rearing horses created by Joe Andoe hangs on a wall near a concession stand on the north side of the building, and a light display created by Jenny Holzer is also within the arena.

Ownership and management
The city of Tulsa owns the arena but has a five-year management contract worth $950,000 with SMG property management, the largest arena manager in the world. SMG, which also manages the nearby Cox Business Center in addition to Paycom Center and Prairie Surf Studios in Oklahoma City, employs more than 70 full-time workers and 400 part-time workers in Tulsa and assumes the building's annual operations cost of $6,267,752. Evan Falat is currently serving as the interim general manager of the BOK Center.

History

A campaign promise by former Tulsa mayor Bill LaFortune to hold a municipal planning conference was fulfilled within months of taking office in 2002. Although voters rejected tax packages for arenas in 1997 and 2000, a third plan for a downtown arena was the brainchild of the conference, along with dozens of other projects throughout Tulsa County, including a renovation of the nearby Tulsa Convention Center costing $42 million. Vision 2025, a tax initiative increasing sales taxes by six-tenths of a cent over 13 years, was approved by voters in September 2003. Pelli's design was released in September 2004 and construction began in August 2005.

Tulsa Vision Builders, a joint project of Tulsa-based Flintco and Manhattan Construction, was chosen to build the arena. Its original budget was deemed $141 million, but increases in the cost of structural steel, concrete, and labor due to Hurricane Katrina and a robust local economy pushed the cost to $178 million in 2006. An additional $18 million in private funding was used in miscellaneous upgrades, bringing the total cost of the arena to $196 million.

Event history
A ribbon-cutting ceremony involving Tulsa musicians Garth Brooks and Hanson took place on August 30, 2008. The arena's schedule of concerts and other events began on August 31 with a community choir hosted by Sam Harris.

The first announced concert was on September 6, 2008, and featured the Eagles. Since its grand opening, the BOK Center has hosted many big-name acts such as Paul McCartney, Billy Joel, Elton John, U2, Justin Timberlake, Garth Brooks, Britney Spears, Janet Jackson, Lady Gaga, Guns N' Roses, Kenny Chesney, Bruce Springsteen, Twenty One Pilots, AC/DC, Metallica, Nine Inch Nails, Celine Dion, Taylor Swift, Brad Paisley, Dane Cook, Jonas Brothers, The Weeknd, Panic! At The Disco, and Dua Lipa. The Eagles also scheduled a rare second performance at the BOK Center after their first concert sold out in 35 minutes. In late 2008, BOK Center General Manager John Bolton was given Venues Today's "Hall of Headlines" award after a poll of venue managers, owners, operators and bookers determined that Bolton had the highest level of success in booking high-quality performances among international venues in 2008.

On September 22, 2018, and September 21, 2019, the Dallas Stars hosted exhibition games at the venue against the Florida Panthers. Both games resulted in Panthers victories, 4–3 in overtime and 6-0 respectively.

On October 13, 2008, the NBA's Oklahoma City Thunder played the Houston Rockets in its first preseason game since leaving Seattle for Oklahoma and was the first major sporting event at the BOK Center. As of August 2008, the Thunder was seeking to play preseason games annually in Tulsa, although the number of games had not been determined. The next Thunder preseason game took place on October 3, 2017, against the Houston Rockets.

The BOK Center is home to one minor league professional sports team, the Tulsa Oilers ice hockey team of the ECHL. The arena was formerly the home of the Tulsa Talons Arena Football League team from 2009 (while they were in the af2) to 2011. Also, the Tulsa Shock of the Women's National Basketball Association, previously known as the Detroit Shock, played all play their home games at the BOK Center from 2010 to 2015 before relocating to Dallas-Ft. Worth.

In March 2010, the Conference USA men's basketball tournament was held there. BOK Center later hosted second and third-round games in the NCAA Men's Division I Basketball Championship on March 18 and 20, 2011.

The Professional Bull Riders began hosting Built Ford Tough Series events at the BOK Center in 2009, after having previously occupied the Tulsa Convention Center.

On June 20, 2020, US President Donald Trump visited the BOK Center for a campaign rally. This was his first campaign rally in 110 days. The reported attendance turnout was seemingly "lower than expected", though it attracted considerable cable news and political network ratings.

Notable event facts
Paul McCartney performed on August 17, 2009. The event launched the "One Year Birthday" celebration of the venue. The stop in Tulsa was McCartney's first in Oklahoma since 2002 and was the only arena show of his 2009 Summer Tour. McCartney also played at the venue on May 29 and 30, 2013, as part of his Out There! Tour.

Events

 Eagles: September 6, 2008
 Kenny Chesney September 10, 2008
 American Idols LIVE! Tour 2008 September 13, 2008
 Get Motivated Seminar September 22, 2008
 Neil Diamond October 21, 2008
 Janet Jackson October 26, 2008
 Metallica November 18, 2008
 Casting Crowns  Christmas Celebration November 20, 2008
 AC/DC January 26, 2009
 Celine Dion Taking Chances World Tour February 2, 2009
 Larry The Cable Guy February 13, 2009
 Bruce Springsteen April 7, 2009
 Jonas Brothers June 22, 2009
 Aerosmith July 30, 2009
 The Wiggles August 7, 2009
 Paul McCartney August 17, 2009
 Britney Spears September 15, 2009
 Taylor Swift September 27, 2009
 Miley Cyrus October 12, 2009
 Kiss and Buckcherry December 8, 2009 Alive 35 World Tour
 George Strait & Reba McEntire: February 20, 2010
 Bon Jovi on April 13, 2010, during The Circle Tour
 Nickelback: April 24, 2010
 Brooks & Dunn: May 28, 2010
 Justin Bieber: July 6, 2010
 Rush: September 21, 2010; Time Machine Tour
 Lady Gaga April 4, 2011; The Monster Ball Tour
 Katy Perry California Dreams Tour September 11, 2011
 Taylor Swift September 21, 2011; Speak Now World Tour
 Reba McEntire November 4, 2011; All the Women I Am Tour
 Roger Waters The Wall; May 5, 2012 
 Big Time Rush Big Time Summer Tour July 13, 2012;
 The Wiggles Celebration Tour  July 25, 2012
 Justin Bieber January 9, 2013
 Kid Rock February 9, 2013; Rebel Soul Tour
 Maroon 5 The Overexposed Tour March 22, 2013;
 Styx, Reo Speedwagon and Ted Nugent May 8, 2013
 Paul McCartney May 29 & 30, 2013; Out There! Tour
 Blake Shelton The Ten Times Crazier Tour October 4, 2013;
 Justin Timberlake The 20/20 Experience World Tour November 21, 2013
 Tobymac Hits Deep Tour December 12, 2013;
 Imagine Dragons: February 22, 2014; Into the Night Tour
 Miley Cyrus March 13, 2014; Bangerz Tour
 Cher: March 29, 2014; D2K Tour
 George Strait with Ronnie Dunn: April 19, 2014; The Cowboy Rides Away Tour
 Dave Matthews Band: May 21, 2014; DMB 2014 Summer Tour
 Bruno Mars Moonshine Jungle Tour June 4, 2014
 Mötley Crüe July 13, 2014; Final Tour
 Michael Bublé August 1, 2014; To Be Loved Tour
 OneRepublic Native Summer Tour August 28, 2014;
 Kiss and Def Leppard August 29, 2014
 Brantley Gilbert September 20, 2014
 Demi Lovato Demi World Tour September 21, 2014;
 One Direction Where We Are Tour: September 23, 2014
 Lecrae October 2, 2014
 Katy Perry Prismatic World Tour October 6, 2014;
 Pearl Jam October 9, 2014
 Eric Church The Outsiders World Tour November 1, 2014;
 Casting Crowns Thrive Tour November 22, 2014;
 The Black Keys The Turn Blue World Tour December 20, 2014
 Sesame Street Live
 Garth Brooks and Trisha Yearwood: January 9, 10, 11, 15, 16 and 17, 2015; World Tour
 Nickelback April 7, 2015; No Fixed Address World Tour
 Jason Aldean April 10, 2015
 Joel Osteen April 24, 2015
 Fluffy April 25, 2015
 Rush: May 8, 2015; R40 Live Tour
 Ed Sheeran x Tour May 9, 2015
 Kenny Chesney May 14, 2015
 Nitro Circus Live May 21, 2015
 Luke Bryan Kick the Dust Up Tour June 18, 2015
 Fall Out Boy July 22, 2015
 Hillsong United Outcry Tour August 5, 2015
 The Price is Right Live  September 20, 2015
 Florida Georgia Line September 25, 2015
 Ariana Grande The Honeymoon Tour October 7, 2015
 Def Leppard, Foreigner and Tesla: October 9, 2015
 Chris Tomlin October 25, 2015
 TobyMac December 6, 2015
 Madonna Rebel Heart Tour January 14, 2016
 Tool January 16, 2016
 Harlem Globetrotters February 5 & 7, 2016
 Iron Maiden February 26, 2016
 Brad Paisley February 27, 2016
 Bassmaster Classic March 4–6, 2016
 Rodney Carrington March 11, 2016
 Winter Jam March 13, 2016
 Sesame Street Live April 1 & 2, 2016
 Zac Brown Band April 3, 2016
 Mumford & Sons April 6, 2016
 Justin Bieber Purpose World Tour April 7, 2016
 Outcry Tour April 14, 2016
 Barry Manilow April 15, 2016
 Amy Schumer April 16, 2016
 Carrie Underwood Storyteller Tour: Stories in the Round April 27, 2016
 The 1975 May 4, 2016
 Jeff Dunham May 6, 2016
 Pentatonix May 7, 2016
 WWE Live June 4, 2016
 Wingapalooza June 11, 2016
 Selena Gomez Revival Tour June 19, 2016
 James Taylor June 24, 2016
 Modest Mouse with Brand New July 21, 2016
 Shinedown July 27, 2016
 Jim Gaffigan July 30, 2016
 Dolly Parton August 12, 2016
 5 Seconds of Summer Sounds Live Feels Live World Tour August 18, 2016
 Coldplay A Head Full of Dreams Tour August 25, 2016
 Professional Bull Riders August 27 & 28, 2016
 Dixie Chicks September 8, 2016
 I Love the 90s Tour September 9, 2016
 Mother Road Revival featuring Jason Isbell September 10, 2016
 Oklahoma City Thunder vs. Memphis Grizzlies October 13, 2016
 Black Sabbath The End Tour November 8, 2016
 Billy Joel November 11, 2016
 Trans-Siberian Orchestra December 1, 2016
 Amy Grant & Michael W. Smith December 3, 2016
 Monster Jam January 7 & 8, 2017
 Red Hot Chili Peppers January 14, 2017
 Cirque du Soleil OVO January 25–29, 2017
 Eric Church Holdin' My Own Tour February 2, 2017
 Ariana Grande Dangerous Woman Tour February 9, 2017
 Twenty One Pilots Emotional Roadshow World Tour February 21, 2017
 NCAA D1 Men's Baskebatball Championship First/Second Rounds March 17 & 19, 2017
 Panic! at the Disco Death of a Bachelor Tour April 4, 2017
 Chance the Rapper May 9, 2017
 Ed Sheeran ÷ Tour August 17, 2017
 Janet Jackson State of the World Tour September 17, 2017
 Kidz Bop October 14, 2017
 The Weeknd Starboy: Legend of the Fall Tour October 21, 2017
 Guns N' Roses Not in This Lifetime... Tour November 14, 2017
 Katy Perry Witness: The Tour November 29, 2017
 Kid Rock February 2, 2018
 Blake Shelton February 15, 2018
 P!nk Beautiful Trauma Tour March 5, 2018
 Judas Priest April 26, 2018 Firepower World Tour
 Panic! at the Disco Pray for the Wicked Tour August 5, 2018
 U2 May 2, 2018
 Justin Timberlake Man of the Woods Tour May 5, 2018
 Willie Nelson May 16, 2018
 Depeche Mode Global Spirit Tour May 29, 2018
 George Strait Strait Down Route 66 June 1 & 2, 2018
 Lorde Melodrama World Tour March 21, 2018
 Niall Horan Flicker World Tour July 28, 2018
 Journey / Def Leppard July 9, 2018
 Sugarland July 19, 2018
 Ozuna October 19, 2018 Aura Tour
 4U A Symphonic Celebration Of Prince October 20, 2018
 Imagine Dragons August 1, 2018
 Chris Young September 15, 2018
 Bruno Mars Cardi B 24K Magic World Tour October 11 and 12, 2018
 Kevin Hart October 28, 2018
 Metallica January 18, 2019
 Elton John February 9, 2019
 Travis Scott March 26, 2019
 Shawn Mendes July 20, 2019
 Billie Eilish October 7, 2019
 Chance the Rapper October 26, 2019
Tool October 29, 2019
 WWE SmackDown Jan 31, 2020
 Sturgill Simpson Cancelled
 The Black Crowes Postponed 
 Donald Trump Rally June 20, 2020
 Bon Jovi Cancelled 
 Justin Bieber June 17, 2021Changes Tour
 Tame Impala Cancelled 
 Marco Antonio Solis Cancelled 
 Vampire Weekend Cancelled 
 Def Leppard with ZZ Top Cancelled 
 KISS October 2, 2021
 WWE SmackDown August 13, 2021
 Chris Stapleton August 20, 2021
 The Weeknd August 21, 2021 The After Hours Tour
 Alan Jackson August 27, 2022 
 Dan+Shay November 13, 2021
 Joe Rogan December 4, 2021 
 Jeff Dunham January 29, 2021 
 Tool January 30, 2022
 Eric Church February 19, 2022 
 Dua Lipa March 17, 2022, Future Nostalgia Tour
 Justin Bieber March 18, 2022
 Slipknot March 23, 2022 Knotfest Roadshow 2022
 Snoop Dogg March 24, 2022
 Snoop Dogg March 25, 2022
 Koe Wetzel April 9, 2022
 Marco Antonio Solis April 29, 2022
 Lamb of God May 8, 2022
 Eagles May 16, 2022
 Brooks & Dunn May 21, 2022
 Jack White May 24, 2022
 Machine Gun Kelly July 9, 2022
 Jason Aldean August 6, 2022
 OneRepublic August 10, 2022
 The Lumineers August 17, 2022
 Poison August 20, 2022
 Bill Burr September 8, 2022
 Iron Maiden September 15, 2022
 WWE Raw January 30, 2023
 The Judds featuring Wynnona Judd The Final Tour February 2, 2023
 TobyMac March 25, 2023, Hits Deep Tour 2023

Impact and reception

Tulsa's downtown was the site of projects anchored by BOK Center, including a $42 million renovation of the Tulsa Convention Center, a $20 million renovation of downtown streets, a $4 million renovation and expansion of a nearby parking garage, streetscape improvements, and art deco-style signs directing visitors to parking garages, public buildings, specialty districts, and entertainment venues. The arena was expected to host 148 major and minor events in its first year, which was anticipated to generate $1.5 million in tax revenue and $92 million in economic impact. SMG was expected to earn $6,553,250 in revenue, giving it a $285,498 annual profit. In its first four months of operation, BOK Center's ticket sales were nearly enough to reach Venues Today'''s top 20 worldwide rankings for total ticket sales in 2008 among venues seating 15,001-30,000. The arena reached $20 million in sales in 2008, and was projected to surpass at least $30 million in 2009, which would put it within the top 15 worldwide in sales according to the 2008 rankings.

The arena won Facilities Magazine's Prime Site Award in 2008, which is based on opinions from representatives in the site selection industry, booking agents, promoters, talent buyers, and special event planners, who judge based on location, functionality, technical capabilities, quality of staff, food and beverage, lighting, sound, and staging. The arena was also one of four venues nominated for Pollstar's 2008 "Best New Major Concert Venue" award, which is set to be decided in January 2009. In its first three months of operation, the facility was featured or set to be featured in at least four major venue publications, including Venues Today'', which gave its 2008 "Hall of Headlines" award to BOK Center manager John Bolton after a poll of venue managers, owners, operators and bookers determined that Bolton had the highest level of success worldwide in booking high-quality performances in 2008. In late 2008, a survey of BOK Center visitors found that 96.7% felt the building's overall impression, staff, concessions, merchandise, and traffic flow were favorable.

The flowing design and acoustic properties of BOK Center have been praised by Tulsa Vision Builders, Tulsa city officials, and Garth Brooks. Officials from Flintco and Manhattan Construction have called the BOK Center one of the best architectural designs in their 100-year histories of building projects. The companies have worked on AT&T Stadium, NRG Stadium in Houston, Texas, Gallagher-Iba Arena at Oklahoma State University, Paycom Center in Oklahoma City, the FedEx Forum in Memphis, Tennessee, and stadium renovations at the University of Oklahoma and OSU, among other projects. City officials have praised Pelli for the design, and Brooks, who held a 2007 concert at Kansas City's new Sprint Center, said at the BOK Center's grand opening, "You guys have got (the Sprint Center) beat hands down. It houses as many people, yet it's warm and small. It's as beautiful and grand as any place I've played." Pelli reacted to the arena's completion by saying that it had taken a "life of its own" since he designed the building, but that the results were exciting and impressed him. He said the building has taken a form that pays tribute to Tulsa's art deco, the nearby Arkansas River, and the city's American Indian history, and anticipated that it would be a major catalyst for private development in Tulsa's downtown area.

Transportation

City officials estimate there are 12,000 parking spaces within a 10-minute walk of the BOK Center with a city-owned parking garage diagonally across the street from the arena. During major events, Tulsa Transit runs free shuttle bus services to and from the arena and downtown Tulsa. Through a program instituted by the Tulsa Convention and Visitors Bureau, 50 guides are stationed within dozens of blocks of the arena during major events to help with parking and provide general information about shuttle services, events, and downtown Tulsa.

References

https://www.concertarchives.org/venues/bok-center--2?page=2#concert-table

External links

 Official website

2008 establishments in Oklahoma
Basketball venues in Oklahoma
César Pelli buildings
Indoor arenas in Oklahoma
Indoor ice hockey venues in the United States
Sports venues completed in 2008
Sports venues in Tulsa, Oklahoma
Tulsa Shock venues
Tourist attractions in Tulsa, Oklahoma